Nerijus Ališauskas (born 6 June 1991) is a Lithuanian professional ice hockey player for Spišská Nová Ves of the Slovak Tipos Extraliga.

He plays as a defenceman and was previously a member of SC Energija II, Liepājas Metalurgs, Almaty, Temirtau, Dinamo Riga, and Slovan Bratislava.

Playing career
Ališauskas first played hockey at the age of eight. He started his career with hometown SC Energija farm team, SC Energija II, and played for them during the 2006–07 season. From 2007 to 2013, he played for Liepājas Metalurgs and its farm teams. Ališauskas spent the 2013–14 season with EV Füssen of German Oberliga. After the season he moved to Kazakhstan Hockey Championship and played for Almaty and Temirtau, also spending two seasons with Saryarka Karagandy of the Supreme Hockey League (VHL).

On 4 July 2017, Ališauskas joined the training camp of Dinamo Riga of the Kontinental Hockey League (KHL). On 16 August, it was announced that Ališauskas signed a one-year deal with Dinamo Riga. He was the second Lithuanian to play in the KHL, following Darius Kasparaitis. On 14 August 2018, Ališauskas re-signed with Dinamo Riga. On 30 July 2020, Ališauskas signed a one-year deal with Slovan Bratislava of the Slovak Tipos Extraliga. On 2 May 2021, after the conclusion of the 2020–21 season, he returned to Dinamo Riga of the KHL. On 15 February 2022, his contract with Dinamo Riga was terminated and he signed with Vita Hästen of HockeyAllsvenskan. On 26 June, Ališauskas signed a one-year deal with Spišská Nová Ves of the Slovak Tipos Extraliga.

International play
Ališauskas was a member of Lithuania's U-18 and U-20 national teams from 2006 until 2011. From 2011, he has been a member of senior national team, though he missed the 2017 Division I tournament.

Career statistics

Regular season and playoffs

References

External links
 
 

1991 births
Living people
Dinamo Riga players
EV Füssen players
Expatriate ice hockey players in Germany
Expatriate ice hockey players in Kazakhstan
Expatriate ice hockey players in Latvia
Expatriate ice hockey players in Slovakia
Expatriate ice hockey players in Sweden
HC Almaty players
HC Slovan Bratislava players
HC Temirtau players
HC Vita Hästen players
HK Liepājas Metalurgs players
HK Spišská Nová Ves players
Lithuanian expatriate sportspeople in Germany
Lithuanian expatriate sportspeople in Kazakhstan
Lithuanian expatriate sportspeople in Latvia
Lithuanian expatriate sportspeople in Slovakia
Lithuanian expatriate sportspeople in Sweden
Lithuanian expatriate ice hockey people
Lithuanian ice hockey defencemen
People from Elektrėnai
Saryarka Karagandy players